Rachel Ehrenfeld is an expert on terrorism and corruption-related topics.  These include terror financing, economic warfare, and narcoterrorism. She has lectured on these issues in many countries, and has advised banking communities, law enforcement agencies, and governments.

Ehrenfeld serves as director of the American Center for Democracy and its Economic Warfare Institute.

Career

Ehrenfeld was a visiting scholar at Columbia University's Institute of War and Peace Studies, a research scholar at New York University School of Law, and a fellow at Johns Hopkins SAIS. Her Ph.D., in criminology, is from the Hebrew University School of Law.

Ehrenfeld's articles have appeared in The Wall Street Journal, The New York Times, Newsweek, The Guardian, The Washington Times, National Review, Huffington Post, The Eurobserver, The Jerusalem Post, the New York Sun, and the Los Angeles Times. She has appeared as a commentator on television and radio news programs, including The O'Reilly Factor, Fox News, CNN, ABC, NBC, and MSNBC. She is also a contributor to the Terror Finance Blog.

Ehrenfeld has testified before the U.S. Congress, the European Parliament, the French Parliament and the Parliament of Canada on terror financing.  She has also provided evidence to the British Parliament alleging corruption of the Palestinian Authority and has testified before the U.S. Congress on terrorism-related issues.

In 2009 she wrote an article advocating the use of mycoherbicides in Afghanistan to suppress opium farming, describing them as "specialized bioherbicide agents designed to inoculate the soil against the growth of certain plants".

In 2010 she wrote an article endorsing profiling at airports.

Rachel's Law and Free Speech Legislation

Ehrenfeld became involved in an international legal controversy when she was sued for libel in the United Kingdom.

In her book, "Funding Evil", Ehrenfeld alleged that Saudi billionaire Khalid bin Mahfouz had financed al-Qaeda through his bank and the charitable organization. Mahfouz denied the allegations. Ehrenfeld, a U.S. citizen based in New York, had not written or marketed her book internationally and refused to acknowledge the jurisdiction of the British court over her case. Her refusal resulted in the British Court awarding a default judgment against her.

Represented by her attorney, Daniel Kornstein, Ehrenfeld pre-emptively countersued Mahfouz in New York to obtain a declaration that the judgment would not be enforced in the United States and that her book was not defamatory under United States defamation law. When the New York courts ruled that they lacked personal jurisdiction over Mahfouz,  the New York State legislature took immediate action and unanimously passed the Libel Terrorism Protection Act (also known as "Rachel's Law"). Rachel's Law was signed into law on April 29, 2008. The law "offers New Yorkers greater protection against libel judgments in countries whose laws are inconsistent with the freedom of speech granted by the United States Constitution."

As of July 2010, six other states have passed analogs to Rachel's Law: Illinois, Florida, California, Tennessee, Maryland, and Utah. A federal bill based on Rachel's Law was passed unanimously out of the Judiciary Committee and has since then been approved by both Houses of Congress. President Obama signed the bill into law on 10 August 2010. The bill, S. 3518, titled Securing and Protecting our Enduring and Established Constitutional Heritage Act (Speech Act), includes several measures aimed at closing loopholes in First Amendment protections for free speech. The act bars enforcement of foreign libel judgments that conflict with the American constitutional due process and the First Amendment. The burden of proof is also placed on the party suing for enforcement. The party suing to prevent enforcement may also sue the libel plaintiff for a declaration that the foreign libel judgment is "repugnant" to American constitutional law, and is entitled to attorney's fees for resultant legal proceedings.

The new federal law, and the existing seven state laws that predate it, can not protect American persons who exercise First Amendment rights but who then travel abroad and then become subject to the physical application of foreign libel laws and judgments. Some countries, for example, Thailand, have laws that cite jurisdiction over speech exercised outside their countries and which mandate punishment for libel inside the foreign plaintiff's country even though the speech may have occurred outside. Extraterritorial jurisdiction over First Amendment rights has not been the focus of attention in international legal jurisprudence or focus in the diplomatic community.

Ehrenfeld's efforts at libel law reform in the United States inspired the Libel Reform Campaign an NGO campaign with over 55,000 supporters.

Books
Funding Evil; How Terrorism is Financed and How to Stop It, Bonus Books, 2003, 2005)
Evil Money, Encounters Along the Money Trail (HarperCollins in 1992, SPI, 1994)
Narco-Terrorism; How Governments around the World used the Drug Trade to Finance and Further Terrorist Activities (Basic Books, 1990 & 1992)

References

External links

Profile at the International Analyst Network
Intelligence Summit biography
The Terror Finance Blog Frequent posts by Ehrenfeld on terror finance issues.

Living people
American women journalists
American political writers
American Israel Public Affairs Committee
Year of birth missing (living people)
21st-century American women